Events from the year 1590 in India.

Events
 Second battle of Rohinkhed

Births
 Virji Vora, merchant (died around 1670)

Deaths

See also

 Timeline of Indian history